The Cassino Assembly Plant is a car assembly plant owned by Stellantis. It is located in the town of Piedimonte San Germano, three kilometres from Cassino, in the province of Frosinone, Italy. The car assembly plant started in 1972 with the production of Fiat 126. Today, it has a total surface area of two million square metres, of which 400 thousand are covered. The plant currently employs around 4,300 people.

Over seven million Fiat, Lancia and Alfa Romeo cars have rolled out over time. Models include the Fiat Tipo, Fiat Bravo/Brava, Fiat Tempra, Fiat Croma, Fiat Stilo, Lancia Delta, Alfa Romeo Giulietta, Alfa Romeo Giulia and Alfa Romeo Stelvio.

History 
A big plant was built in 1972 near Cassino to build a little car: the Fiat 126. It would be a successful, long-living model and production will be discontinued only in 2000. The 126 would also be the last Fiat to fit a rear engine. Production continued next to a new Fiat model, the 131, which was introduced in 1974 and would be discontinued in 1984.

Production of the Fiat Ritmo, the new Italian mid-size car, was kicked off six years after the plant was opened. It was 1978, the year when Comau Robogate systems were installed in the Fiat Rivalta plant and in Cassino. This highly automated system was designed to facilitate and speed up the tasks of workers in the Body Shop. The plant was now operating at full capacity. Production of a new car – the Fiat Regata – started in 1983.

Over little more than ten years, the plant had become firmly established in the area and employed many locals. New models were introduced. 1988 was the year of the Fiat Tipo. The car had a fully galvanised body and the use of new materials forced to modernise the systems. The model would be a best-seller and up to one thousand cars would roll off the lines a day. Many years later, the car would gain everlasting fame in the popular TV serial Inspector Montalbano who is portrayed at the wheel of a Tipo.

Production of the Tempra started one year later. The model came in three versions – sedan, wagon and van, named Marengo – and shared many components with the Tipo, such as the engines, the platform, the doors and the suspension. These models were replaced from 1995 to 1996 by a new family of cars: the Bravo and the Brava, the Marea and the new Marengo van.

With the new millennium came a new renovation for Cassino: the production lines of the Bravo, Brava and Marea were pulled down to give way to the assembly lines of the Stilo, production of which started in 2001. The factory underwent yet another major technological advance when the Robogate was retired and replaced by the Open Gate system that offered more efficient and accurate side panel welding. The production rate of the plant increased and touched 250 thousand cars a year. The new Bravo replaced the Stilo in 2007. The Stilo was discontinued in 2008 while the Croma, which went into production in 2005, was ended five years later. At the same time came the Lancia Delta (that would be discontinued in 2014), and the Alfa Romeo Giulietta, based on the new Compact platform concept. Production of the Alfa Romeo Giulia was kicked off in June 2016.

List of current cars manufactured

List of former cars manufactured

An Alfa Romeo plant 
The Cassino plant has identified with the Alfa Romeo brand since 2015. Modernisation works were started and completed in time for the first introduction phase of the Giulia in 2016.

Sustainability 

The year 2016 marked the turning point for Cassino. Management of the plant is inspired by principles of environmental friendliness and social sustainability. Change Management methods were adopted to transform Cassino into a “World Class Sustainable Plant”. Change Management involved organising WCM Academy activities in the Training Areas and trade schools in which all workers could learn and implement the procedures. All this was triggered by the repositioning of Alfa Romeo as a Premium brand and concerned all industrial processes.

Stamping

Two technologies are used: the traditional "cold" method and the "hot" method. The “cold” forging process is one of the most productive in the world with 16 strikes per minute. The "hot" forging process is based on the principle that a product is stronger the weight being equal. The Press Shop at Cassino serves the main FCA plants in the EMEA and LATAM regions.

Body Shop

This is the most highly automated area of the plant with nearly 1300 robots installed. The impact that the new materials used for making cars have on welding technologies is very obvious here. Techniques are now available to join parts made of light aluminium alloy with parts made of steel. This used to be impossible with conventional spot welding.

Paint Shop

Energy-saving systems with a low environmental impact employing hardly any water are used here. Cassino is one of the first plants in the world to use dry scrubbing technology in the primer booths. Overspray is sucked in by a flow of air and collected in special cardboard separation modules, called Eisenmann E-cubes, instead of being washed away with water. The used filters are recovered by specialised companies. The result translates into less waste, better energy-efficiency and hardly any water. The little water that is used is collected, purified and reused.

The cataphoresis process, instead, uses the innovative Eisenmann E-Shuttle system, which features dipping and turning the body in the treatment bath. This technology improves the amount of protective liquid covering the chassis gaps and is ideal for aluminium bodies. Additionally, immersion tanks are much smaller, meaning that less energy and water is needed.

Plastic Components Unit

The Plastic Components Unit became part of the plant in 2014 and manages all principal processes for the production of plastic components: moulding, blowing, painting, thermoforming, foaming and assembly. Front and rear bumpers, dashboard shells, tunnel consoles and fuel tanks are made here for Cassino and for other FCA plants.

Assembly Line

Manual work is very important on the two Assembly Lines, one dedicated to the Alfa Romeo Giulietta and the other dedicated to the Giulia. This is why new workstations designed to reduce fatigue and improve ergonomics have been introduced. For instance, the special adaptive platforms automatically adjust the height of the workstation according to the stature of the person working there.

WCM

World Class Manufacturing (WCM) is the continuous improvement methodology adopted in FCA plants worldwide aimed at maximising competitiveness by eliminating waste, fostering personnel involvement and achieving high-quality standards. Product quality, workplace safety and environmental performance are the mainstays. WCM was introduced in Cassino in 2005: the plant was awarded WCM Bronze just three years later and Silver in 2009. WCM is central for Cassino, in particular for managing the ergonomics, safety and automation of workstations.

Work Place Integration 
Work Place Integration (WPI), introduced in Cassino with the Giulia, is the approach used to make workstations according to better ergonomic standards. Each single workstation was designed and built by involving people and their experience. Many positive changes have been introduced on the Assembly Line, where the incidence of manual work is higher.

Respect for the environment

The Cassino plant is characterised by the careful exploitation of natural resources, which has made it possible to achieve considerable results. The chosen technologies have the goal of eliminating the need to draw water from local sources for the industrial process. CO2 emissions of the production cycle as a whole are entirely compensated and no industrial waste is sent to the landfill. The same water is reused several times in the Body Shop and on the Assembly Line. In the Paint Shop, it was eliminated and replaced by dry filters in the paint booths. Energy use is also low because state-of-the-art technologies are used, like LED lights or energy heat recovery. Furthermore, the plant uses only electricity from guaranteed renewable sources or generated by solar panels.

Even the CO2 produced by the combustion of methane for industrial purposes is compensated by buying credits on the international market.

Correlated items 
 Fiat
 Alfa Romeo
 Giulia
 Giulietta

External links 
 Alfa Romeo
 FCA
 Sustainability Report
 Alfa Romeo Press

References 

Fiat Group factories
Fiat
Motor vehicle assembly plants in Italy